The Special Anti-terrorist Unit is a police unit from North Macedonia. It's one of the prestigious divisions in North Macedonian Police.

Notable domestic missions
2001 Albanian Insurgency
2007 Operation Mountain Storm
2008 Police action: Ash, (Bajrush clan)
2010 Police action: Conductor, (Frankfurt Mafia)
2012 Arrests after Smilkovci lake killings
2014 Police action: Network, (Grchec clan)
2014 Police action: Kalabria, (Nezim clan)
2014 Police action: Hammer, (Fadilj Arslani clan)
2015 Kumanovo shootings

Foreign missions

Serbia
2014 Floods in Serbia – 24 men and one Mi-17.

Bosnia and Herzegovina
2014 Floods in Bosnia – 15 men.

See also

Alpha (Police Unit)
Special Support Unit
Rapid Deployment Unit
Border Police
Ministry of Internal Affairs
Police of North Macedonia
Lake Patrol
Lions former

References

External links
Video about Tigers (in Macedonian)

Specialist law enforcement agencies of North Macedonia